Leonard Emanuel Parker (born Leonard Pearlman in 1938 in Brooklyn, New York) is a Distinguished Professor Emeritus of Physics and a former Director of the Center for Gravitation and Cosmology at the University of Wisconsin–Milwaukee. During the late 1960s, Parker established a new area of physics—quantum field theory in curved spacetime.  Specifically, by applying the technique of Bogoliubov transformations to quantum field theory with a changing gravitational field, he discovered the physical mechanism now known as cosmological particle production. His breakthrough discovery has a surprising consequence: the expansion of the universe can create particles out of the vacuum.
His work inspired research by hundreds of physicists and has been cited in more than 2,000 research papers; it was credited in the memoirs of Soviet physicist Andrei Sakharov and helped Stephen Hawking discover the creation of particles by black holes.

Along with David Toms of Newcastle University, Parker co-wrote a latest addition to graduate-level textbooks on quantum field theory in curved spacetime, entitled Quantum Field Theory in Curved Spacetime: Quantized Fields and Gravity (Cambridge University Press, 2009).

He received his PhD from Harvard University in 1967. His advisor was Sidney Coleman.

Awards and honors
1984 Elected Fellow, American Physical Society
2000 The Parker symposium

References

External links
 Parker's faculty page at University of Wisconsin–Milwaukee
 The Center for Gravitation and Cosmology
 Milwaukee Journal Sentinel article about Leonard Parker

Living people
20th-century American Jews
21st-century American physicists
American cosmologists
People from Brooklyn
Harvard University alumni
Scientists from Milwaukee
University of Wisconsin–Milwaukee faculty
1938 births
Scientists from New York (state)
21st-century American Jews